José Ángel Vidal Martínez (born 28 October 1969 in Padrón) is a former Spanish cyclist. He rode in 16 Grand Tours.

Major results
1991
2nd Volta da Ascension

References

1969 births
Living people
Spanish male cyclists
People from Santiago (comarca)
Sportspeople from the Province of A Coruña
Cyclists from Galicia (Spain)